Hollywood Thrill Makers is a 1954 American action film directed by Bernard B. Ray and starring James Gleason, William Henry and Diana Darrin. It was distributed by Lippert Pictures. It is also known as Hollywood Stuntmen. It follows the lives of several Hollywood stuntmen.

Cast
James Gleason as Risky Russell
William Henry as Dave Wilson
Jean Holcombe as Joan Cummings
James Macklin as Bill Cummings
Diana Darrin as Marion Russell
 Robert Paquin as Cameraman
 Janet Clark as Gladys
 Jack George as 	Carl Von Snidenhousen - Director
 George Sherwood as 	Film Crew
 Fred Kohler Jr. as Film Crew
 	Daine Frankel as 	Nancy Wilson
 Linda Heidt as	Woman

Reception
The Monthly Film Bulletin called it an  "Ineptly made, hashed up affair."

The Los Angeles Times said "If you're interested in the antics of Hollywood stunt men, this one might interest you - but not much."

References

External links

Hollywood Thrill makers at TCMDB

1954 films
1950s action films
American action films
Lippert Pictures films
Films directed by Bernard B. Ray
Films about filmmaking
1950s English-language films
American black-and-white films
1950s American films